Glenfield may refer to:

In Australia
Glenfield, New South Wales, a suburb of Sydney
Glenfield Park, New South Wales, a suburb of Wagga Wagga
Glenfield, Western Australia

In New Zealand
Glenfield, New Zealand
Glenfield (New Zealand electorate), a former parliamentary electorate, 1984–1996

In the United Kingdom
Glenfield, Leicestershire
Glenfield (company) a valve business

In the United States
Glenfield Park, New Jersey
Glenfield, North Dakota
Glenfield, Mississippi, a listed Mississippi Landmark 
Glenfield, Pennsylvania

See also
Glenfields (Philipstown, New York), historic building
Glenfield railway station (disambiguation)